This is a list of the busiest railway stations in Poland sorted by the average number of passengers boarding daily in 2019, statistics and data are collected by the .

List 
Stations with daily riderships above 4,500 passengers are shown.

References

External links
Office of Rail Transport 
Nasze dworce Introduction of main railway stations, PKP 

Railway stations
Railway stations
Poland
Busiest railway stations in Poland